The Master of the Pähl Altarpiece was an anonymous Gothic painter, known for the winged altar or triptych he painted for Schloss Pähl in Pähl in the Weilheim-Schongau district of Bavaria at the end of the 14th century. The triptych is now in the Bavarian National Museum.

The Master of the Pähl Altar shows a style of painting influenced by Bohemian masters such as the Master of the Wittingau Altarpiece.

References

Further reading 
 H. Rupé, 1922: Der Pähler Altar im Bayerischen Nationalmuseum. (Deutsche Kunst. 1. Folge, 5. Heft)  München, Weizinger
 H. Rupé, 1948: Divertimenti. Reden und Aufsätze. München, Rinn (containing Der Pähler Altar im Bayerischen Nationalmuseum)

15th-century German painters
Pahl Altarpiece
Year of birth unknown
Year of death unknown